Clinical research is a branch of healthcare science that determines the safety and effectiveness (efficacy) of medications, devices, diagnostic products and treatment regimens intended for human use. These may be used for prevention, treatment, diagnosis or for relieving symptoms of a disease. Clinical research is different from clinical practice. In clinical practice established treatments are used, while in clinical research evidence is collected to establish a treatment.

Overview
The term "clinical research" refers to the entire bibliography of a drug/device/biologic, in fact any test article from its inception in the lab to its introduction to the consumer market and beyond. Once the promising candidate or the molecule is identified in the lab, it is subjected to pre-clinical studies or animal studies where different aspects of the test article (including its safety toxicity if applicable and efficacy, if possible at this early stage) are studied.

In the United States, when a test article is unapproved or not yet cleared by the Food and Drug Administration (FDA), or when an approved or cleared test article is used in a way that may significantly increase the risks (or decreases the acceptability of the risks), the data obtained from the pre-clinical studies or other supporting evidence, case studies of off label use, etc. are submitted in support of an Investigational New Drug (IND) application to the FDA for review prior to conducting studies that involve even one human and a test article if the results are intended to be submitted to or held for inspection by the FDA at any time in the future (in the case of an already approved test article, if intended to submit or hold for inspection by the FDA in support of a change in labeling or advertising). Where devices are concerned the submission to the FDA would be for an Investigational Device Exemption (IDE) application if the device is a significant risk device or is not in some way exempt from prior submission to the FDA. In addition, clinical research may require Institutional Review Board (IRB) or Research Ethics Board (REB) and possibly other institutional committee reviews, Privacy Board, Conflict of Interest Committee, Radiation Safety Committee, Radioactive Drug Research Committee, etc. approval whether or not the research requires prior submission to the FDA. Clinical research review criteria will depend on which federal regulations the research is subject to (e.g., (Department of Health and Human Services (DHHS) if federally funded, FDA as already discussed) and will depend on which regulations the institutions subscribe to, in addition to any more stringent criteria added by the institution possibly in response to state or local laws/policies or accreditation entity recommendations. This additional layer of review (IRB/REB in particular) is critical to the protection of human subjects especially when you consider that often research subject to the FDA regulation for prior submission is allowed to proceed, by those same FDA regulations, 30 days after submission to the FDA unless specifically notified by the FDA not to initiate the study.

Clinical research is often conducted at academic medical centers and affiliated research study sites. These centers and sites provide the prestige of the academic institution as well as access to larger metropolitan areas, providing a larger pool of medical participants. These academic medical centers often have their internal Institutional Review Boards that oversee the ethical conduct of medical research.

The clinical research ecosystem involves a complex network of sites, pharmaceutical companies and academic research institutions. This has led to a growing field of technologies used for managing the data and operational factors of clinical research. Clinical research management is often aided by eClinical systems to help automate the management and conducting of clinical trials.

In the European Union, the European Medicines Agency (EMA) acts in a similar fashion for studies conducted in their region. These human studies are conducted in four phases in research subjects that give consent to participate in the clinical trials.

Phases

Clinical trials involving new drugs are commonly classified into four phases. Each phase of the drug approval process is treated as a separate clinical trial. If the drug successfully passes through Phases I, II, and III, it will be approved by the national regulatory authority for use in the general population. Phase IV is post-approval studies.

Phase I includes 20 to 100 healthy volunteers or individuals with the disease or condition. This study typically lasts several months and its purpose is to prove safety and an effective dosage. Phase II includes a larger number of individual participants in the range of 100–300, and Phase III includes some 1000-3000 participants to assess efficacy and safety of the drug at different doses. Only 25-30% of drugs advance to the end of Phase III.

Before pharmaceutical companies start clinical trials on a drug, they conduct extensive pre-clinical studies.

See also 
Clinical research associate
Clinical research ethics
Clinical Trial Management System
List of pharmaceutical companies
Clinical biostatistics
Medical writing
Evidence-based medicine
Unethical human experimentation

References 

 "Introduction to Clinical Research Informatics", Rachel Richesson, James Andrews

 
Health research